The Mo'Nique Show is an American talk show hosted by comedian and actress Mo'Nique. Aired on BET, the series began October 5, 2009. The show's second and final season premiered on Monday, October 4, 2010.

Overview
The show ran all-new episodes Monday through Thursday at 11PM ET, featuring celebrity guests and musical performances. The hour-long program also featured a "resident deejay." Although aired on BET, it was recorded at Turner Broadcasting in Atlanta, Georgia. After being cancelled, The Mo'Nique Show is now on repeat from its final season and airs at 3 a.m.

Premiere episode
On the debut episode, celebrity guests included:
 Steve Harvey, promoted his book Act Like a Lady, Think Like a Man: What Men Really Think About Love, Relationships, Intimacy, and Commitment.
 Monica, promoted her BET show, Monica: Still Standing.
 Live performance by Jeremih, performing Imma Star (Everywhere We Are).

Format
The show begins with the theme song accompanied by an announcer announcing the featured guests.
Mo'Nique appears from an 'elevator', and is walked down the stairs by Rodney Perry. Mo'Nique proceeds to center stage and begins her monologue. At the conclusion of each show, Mo'Nique gives her final thoughts; these final thoughts usually pertain to the monologue from the beginning of the show and/or the guests that appeared on the episode. Following her final thoughts, she instructs her studio audience as well as home viewers to "take their arms and wrap them around themselves and squeeze real tight, because we've all just been hugged."

Ratings
The debut episode attracted over 1.5 million viewers, 850,000 of which were said to have come from the 18–49 demographic.

Awards and nominations
NAACP Image Awards
 2010 Award for Outstanding Talk Series
2011 Nomination for Outstanding Talk Series

References

2009 American television series debuts
2011 American television series endings
2000s American late-night television series
2010s American late-night television series
2000s American television talk shows
2010s American television talk shows
English-language television shows
BET original programming
Television shows filmed in Atlanta